A meter serial number (MSN, or 'meter ID') is an alphanumeric reference used in Great Britain to identify an electricity meter. Although meter serial numbers are intended to be unique, this can not be assured and duplicate serial numbers do exist. There are a variety of formats used over many years, but many meter serial numbers take the form A##AA###### (e.g. S06DS123456). The first letter indicates the manufacturer, the first two digits indicate the year the meter was calibrated and certified, and the second letter (or pair of letters) indicates the company that purchased the meter. The five/six digit sequence is a serial batch number. There may be a space separating the groups of numbers and letters.

Electricity meters in other countries besides Great Britain do not necessarily follow this standard.

See also
 Electricity billing in the UK
 Meter Point Administration Number (MPAN)

References

Electric power in the United Kingdom
Energy in the United Kingdom
Serial numbers
Utilities of the United Kingdom